In enzymology, a [citrate (pro-3S)-lyase] ligase is an enzyme that catalyzes the chemical reaction

ATP + acetate + citrate (pro-3S)-lyase(thiol form)  AMP + diphosphate + citrate (pro-3S)-lyase(acetyl form)

The 3 substrates of this enzyme are ATP, acetate, and citrate (pro-3S)-lyase(thiol form), whereas its 3 products are AMP, diphosphate, and citrate (pro-3S)-lyase(acetyl form).

This enzyme belongs to the family of ligases, specifically those forming carbon-sulfur bonds as acid-thiol ligases.  The systematic name of this enzyme class is acetate:citrate (pro-3S)-lyase(thiol-form) ligase (AMP-forming). Other names in common use include citrate lyase ligase, citrate lyase synthetase, acetate: SH-acyl-carrier-protein enzyme ligase (AMP), acetate:HS-citrate lyase ligase, and acetate:citrate-(pro-3S)-lyase(thiol-form) ligase (AMP-forming).  This enzyme participates in two-component system - general.

References

 
 
 
 

EC 6.2.1
Enzymes of unknown structure